Cressidae is a family of amphipods. The family contains two genera:
Cressa Boeck, 1857
Cressina Stephensen, 1931

References

Gammaridea
Taxa named by Thomas Roscoe Rede Stebbing
Crustacean families